Frank and Amelia Jones House, at 18000 Castillo Rd. in La Mesa, New Mexico, was built around 1904.  It was listed on the National Register of Historic Places in 2014.

It has also been known as Martinez-Hernandez Farm and as Ness House.

It is a one-story  adobe house with a high hipped roof.

References

National Register of Historic Places in Doña Ana County, New Mexico
Houses completed in 1904